John William Chapman (September 8, 1894 August 17, 1978) was the 37th Lieutenant Governor of Illinois. Chapman was born in Crete, Nebraska September 8, 1894. Chapman attended Public school in Chicago. He graduated from the University of Chicago in 1915 and received a Juris Doctor from University of Chicago Law School in 1917. He entered private practice in Chicago in the 1920s until he moved to Springfield, Illinois in 1941. In 1927, he was elected an Alderman on the Chicago City Council for the 40th ward and served for one term before losing to Joseph C. Ross in 1929. He served as executive secretary to Illinois Governor Dwight H. Green from 1941 to 1949. In 1941 he was appointed to the Illinois Parole Board serving until March 1950. He was elected Lieutenant Governor of Illinois and served from 1953 to 1961. He died August 17, 1978, in Broward County, Florida and was cremated.

References

External links
 1953–1954 Illinois Blue Book – Lt. Governor biography page 98
 http://politicalgraveyard.com/bio/chapman.html

1894 births
1978 deaths
Lieutenant Governors of Illinois
Politicians from Springfield, Illinois
People from Crete, Nebraska
University of Chicago Law School alumni
Chicago City Council members
Illinois Republicans
Methodists from Illinois
20th-century American politicians